Robin Söderling was the defending champion, but did not participate this year.

Andy Roddick won the tournament, beating Gaël Monfils 6–3, 6–2 in the final.

Seeds

Draw

Finals

Top half

Bottom half

References

 Main Draw
 Qualifying Draw

Singles
2005 ATP Tour